Agios Nikolaos, Hagios Nikolaos or Aghios Nikolaos is a coastal city on the Greek island of Crete, lying east of the island's capital Heraklion, north of the city of Ierapetra and west of the city of Sitia.

In the year 2011, the Municipality of Agios Nikolaos, which takes in part of the surrounding villages, claimed 27,074 inhabitants. The town is a municipality of the Crete region and sits partially upon the ruins of the ancient city of Lato pros Kamara.

History
Agios Nikolaos was settled in the late Bronze Age by Dorian occupants of Lato, at a time when the security of the Lato hillfort became a lesser concern and easy access to the harbour at Agios Nikolaos became more important.

The name Agios Nikolaos means Saint Nicholas. Its stress lies on the second syllable of the word "Nikolaos". Agios Nikolaos or Ayios Nikolaos (alternative romanizations of the Greek ) is a common placename in Greece and Cyprus, since Saint Nicholas is the patron saint of sailors and of all of Greece.

Archaeology
Lato pros Kamara, the ancient Agios Nikolaos, has left some limited ruins but an extensive cemetery of Roman times. Near the town is an archaeological site of ancient Priniatikos Pyrgos. It appears to have been first settled in the Final Neolithic era, circa 3000 BC. Activity on the site continued throughout the Minoan Bronze Age and the Classical Greek and Roman periods, spanning a total of up to 4,000 years. Since 2007, Priniatikos Pyrgos has been undergoing excavation by an international team under the auspices of the Irish Institute of Hellenic Studies at Athens.

Geography

Municipality
The municipality of Agios Nikolaos was formed at the 2011 local government reform by the merger of the following 3 former municipalities, which became municipal units:
Agios Nikolaos
Neapoli
Vrachasi

Infrastructure

Transportation
Agios Nikolaos is accessible from the mainland and the whole of Europe through Heraklion International Airport, and the many daily ferry services in Heraklion . You can also travel through Sitia airport boarding onto a domestic or charter flight or through its harbour . Recently, the town became host to a department of the Hellenic Mediterranean university, offering tourism-related courses.

Culture

Modern Agios Nikolaos

Agios Nikolaos is probably best known as a tourist town that serves as a hub to the twenty or so small villages and farms that make up that part of Lassithi. Tourist attractions include the small lagoon Lake Voulismeni, small beaches in the town, the tiny island of Agioi Pantes, the archaeological museum, the local flora exhibition “Iris” and numerous fairs.

Tourism is mainly West European with Greek tourism concentrated in mid August, though there are a considerable amount of Russian vacationers in East Crete. The lagoon features a small park with a trail, traditional fishing boats, ducks, pigeons, an amphitheatre and many cafès. The modern city of Agios Nikolaos became internationally well known during the 60's, when it was "discovered" by famous cinema directors (Jules Dassin, Walt Disney etc.), BBC producers and many others. It was then that the rapid tourist development of the area started. Among the various productions filmed were He Who Must Die, The Moon-Spinners, and the TV series The Lotus Eaters.

Daphne du Maurier's short story Not After Midnight was set in and around the town.

Climate

Agios Nikolaos has a mild climate throughout the year with very mild winters and warm summers.

Notable residents

Mimis Androulakis (*1951), politician
Maria Damanaki (*1952) politician
Nikos Koundouros (1926–2017), director

See also
Cretan cuisine
Agios Nikolaos, Zakynthos
Agios Nikolaos, Messenia
Agios Nikolaos, Chalkidiki

References

Davaras, Costis, Hagios Nikolaos Museum, Athens 1982; Ρωμαϊκὸ Νεκροταφεῖο Ἁγίου Νικολάου, Ἀρχαιολογικὴ Ἐφημερὶς 1985, pp. 130–216; Führer zu den Altertümern Kretas, Athen 2003, pp. 125–126.
Davaras, Costis, S.Papadaki and N.Klontzas, Ο Αγιος Νικόλαος και η περιοχή του, Herakleion 2001.

External links

Homepage of the Municipality of Agios Nikolaos

Populated places in Lasithi
Mediterranean port cities and towns in Greece
Greek prefectural capitals
Municipalities of Crete